Bhit Shah may refer to:
 Bhit (also called Bhit Shah), Sindh, Pakistan, the town where the shrine of Shah Abdul Latif Bhittai, patron saint of Sindh, is located.
 Bhit Shah Island, near Kiamari Town in Karachi, Sindh